Samuel Cunningham PC (Ire) (14 October 1862 – 23 August 1946) was a businessman, stockbroker and politician from Northern Ireland.

Cunningham was born at Fernhill House, Glencairn, Belfast, and educated at Belfast Academy and at Merchiston Castle School, Edinburgh. He became a stockbroker with his father, Josias's, firm in Belfast, but also acquired business interests, becoming chairman of The Northern Whig newspaper and the tobacco firm Murray Sons & Co Ltd. His sisters, Mary Elizabeth and Sarah Catherine, were heavily involved in the war effort in Belfast during World War I.

Cunningham was appointed to the Privy Council of Ireland in the 1920 New Year Honours following his membership of the Housing Committee on Finance, entitling him to the style "The Right Honourable". He was elected to the Senate of the Parliament of Northern Ireland on its formation in 1921 and served until 1945.

His sons were the politicians James Glencairn Cunningham and Sir Knox Cunningham, the stockbroker Sir Josias Cunningham, and Dunlop McCosh Cunningham, who succeeded him at Murrays.

See also 
Fernhill House

Footnotes

References 
 Obituary, The Times, 24 August 1946

External links
 

1862 births
1946 deaths
Politicians from Belfast
People educated at Merchiston Castle School
Members of the Privy Council of Ireland
Members of the Privy Council of Northern Ireland
Members of the Senate of Northern Ireland 1921–1925
Members of the Senate of Northern Ireland 1925–1929
Members of the Senate of Northern Ireland 1929–1933
Members of the Senate of Northern Ireland 1933–1937
Members of the Senate of Northern Ireland 1937–1941
Members of the Senate of Northern Ireland 1941–1945
Businesspeople from Belfast
Independent politicians in Northern Ireland
People educated at the Belfast Royal Academy
British stockbrokers
Ulster Unionist Party members of the Senate of Northern Ireland
Independent members of the Senate of Northern Ireland